Rawal Express is a passenger train operated daily by Pakistan Railways between Lahore and Rawalpindi.

Route
 Lahore Junction–Rawalpindi via Karachi–Peshawar Railway Line

Station stops 
 Lahore Junction
 Rawalpindi

Equipment
The train offers AC Parlour, AC Lower and Economy class.

Incidents
On 23 November 2016, the locomotive and two carriages of the Rawal Express derailed upon approaching Rawalpindi. No passengers were seriously hurt.

References

Named passenger trains of Pakistan
Passenger trains in Pakistan